The Bad Lord Byron is a 1949 British historical drama film about the life of Lord Byron. It was directed by David MacDonald and starred Dennis Price as Byron with Mai Zetterling, Linden Travers and Joan Greenwood.

Plot
The film sees life from the perspective of Lord Byron, seriously wounded in Greece where he is fighting for Greek independence. From his deathbed, Byron remembers his life and many loves, imagining that he's pleading his case before a celestial court.

The first witness called is Lady Caroline Lamb who recalls their relationship. She met Byron after a ball and they began an affair. He writes the poem She Walks in Beauty about another woman, causing Lady Caroline to stab herself with a broken glass. He breaks things off and Lady Caroline is sent to Ireland.

The next witness is Annabella Milbanke who talks about her romance and marriage to Byron, including the birth of their child.

The third witness is Augusta Leigh, with whom Annabelle thought Byron was having an affair, although Augusta denies it.

John Hobhouse, 1st Baron Broughton is the fourth witness. He talks about Byron's political career and how he became famous overnight through his poetry and meeting Teresa, Contessa Guiccioli.

Teresa is the fifth witness. She talks of their love affair while she was married and his involvement in the Carbonari in Italy. Byron leaves her to go fight for Greek independence. The celestial judge (played by Dennis Price) tells the viewer it is up to them to decide whether Byron was good or bad.

Cast

Production

Development
The film was announced in 1945 by Two Cities with Eric Portman to play the title role (Portman had played Byron on stage). Stewart Granger was mentioned as another possibility. The film was to be written, produced and directed by Terence Young based on the books by Peter Quennell, The Years of Fame and Byron in Italy.

The project was not made but was re-activated when Sydney Box took over Gainsborough Studios in 1946. Box had been considering a film based on Percy Shelley but was also enthusiastic about making one on Byron, who Box greatly admired. He assigned the project to producer Aubrey Baring and director David MacDonald. They greatly reduced Young's script by a half but Box was still dissatisfied with it.

Working with Gainsborough script adviser Paul Holt, Box reconfigured the film to consist of a series of flashbacks about episodes in Byron's life. Box ultimately decided this approach was too derivative of Citizen Kane and made Byron's presence in the film too insubstantial. He then decided to focus the script on Byron's relationship with Teresa Guiccioli but changed his mind with Mai Zetterling who was playing that part was not available.

Shooting
The lead role was given to Dennis Price, who said during shooting he felt Portman should play the role. Linden Travers later recalled the film as "a pretty interesting thing to do, though I think it needed a wilder type than Dennis Price for Byron. It wasn’t very good but I enjoyed it; I really enjoyed working. I was never terribly nervous, because I never carried the whole film on my shoulders."

Location filming began in Italy in October 1947. They returned in December. It was followed by shooting in Shepherd's Bush studio. Filming was done by April.

A Nottingham City librarian refused permission for the filmmakers to shoot at Newstead Abbey because of Byron's reputation. Sydney Box called it "an example of bureaucracy at its worst."

Great effort and much money was spent to ensure the film was as historically accurate as possible in terms of sets and costumes. It was not shot in colour as to do so would have increased its budget  by a third, and also as colour cameras were being used on the film The Blue Lagoon. A huge set was built at Shepherds Bush. Filming took eleven weeks.

Before the film was released, the US announced they would not allow the film to be screened there because of the relationship between Byron and his half-sister, even though it was not featured in the film.

Sydney Box later heard a radio play about Byron, The Trial of Lord Byron by Laurence Kitchin which he thought would tie up some loose ends of the film. It consisted of Byron being hauled before a celestial court and forced to justify his actions. Box bought the rights to the radio play and had David MacDonald shoot 22 minutes of retakes in two days.

Post Production
Alfred Roome was assigned to work on the film as associate producer and said he recut it as it :was so bad the first time. It wasn’t the editor’s fault; the director, David MacDonald, had just let it run, pages of stuff without any cuts. I did all sorts of tricks with it — bits of Byron’s poetry, travel shots — but it was an unsaveable film."

Reception

Critical
The movie received bad reviews. Dennis Price later said "One day I hope to have enough money to make another Byron film — the real story. And if I could get hold of all the scenes we shot and which never appeared in the film, two-thirds of the job would be done."

A critic for Time Out has written of the film:

Box-office
The film was a box-office disaster. By the end of its theatrical first-run release, in 1953, it had earned £75,000, recording a loss of £179,200.

Muriel Box recalled it was the film "that cost us most money" although it "was meticulously researched and several authors worked on it; Dennis Price was very good as Byron, but people didn’t go for it. I could understand the academics wanting something more literary, but you couldn’t have more of that if you wanted mass audiences. I thought it was a reason- able saga of his life, and was very disappointed because we worked like stink on it."

Book
Sydney Box and Vivian Cox wrote a book on the making of the film which was published in 1949.

References

External links
 
Bad Lord Byron at TCMDB
Review of film at Variety

1949 films
1940s historical drama films
1940s biographical drama films
British biographical drama films
British historical drama films
Films set in the 19th century
British black-and-white films
Films set in London
Films set in Greece
Films directed by David MacDonald (director)
Biographical films about poets
1949 drama films
1940s English-language films
1940s British films